Jimmy Davies may refer to:

Jimmy Davies, American racecar driver in Champ cars, and midgets
Jimmy Davies (RAF officer), American airman in World War Two
Jimmy Davies (football manager), English football manager

See also 
 James Davies (disambiguation)
 Jim Davies (disambiguation)
 James Davis (disambiguation)